An entertainment center (or centre), also known as an entertainment complex, is a piece of furniture designed to house consumer electronic appliances and components, such as televisions.

A TV stand is usually a smaller item of furniture, large enough to support an average television of the 1970s or 1980s (with a boxy footprint), often with some additional media components in a cabinet below, such as a stereo amplifier or a DVD player. These were often made of wood and equipped with casters. Wheels allowed access to the cabling from behind, access for cleaning behind and beneath, and permitted temporary relocation of the television for specific viewing scenarios. 

As televisions became larger, they became unwieldy to move, and less in need of being moved due to better viewing at distance; also becoming at the same time much thinner, and more suited to permanent fixture. During this transition, TV stands gave way to entertainment centers in many homes.

Evolution of home TV and stereo

A stereo console (or "console stereo," as it was sometimes called) is a stereo system containing audio components (such as a stereo record changer, tape deck, and a stereo FM radio) housed into a stand-alone cabinet, as was popular in the 1960s and into the 1970s. A stereo consolette (as identified by one of its manufacturers from that period, Delmonico/Nivico) is a smaller, more compact stereo console that often stands on splayed legs. The corresponding term for console in British English is radiogram.

During the 1970's, some stereo manufacturers began designing more lavish and flashy systems to coincide with the psychedelic and disco eras from that decade.  Such as was the case when the New York stereo manufacturer Morse-Electro Products produced some of their units with a built-in light organ display. The multicolored lights in the display would flash to the rhythm of the music being played on the system.

Stereo consoles would ultimately be replaced by high-fidelity component stereo systems with separate speakers (sometimes called "rack systems") in the late 1970s, which offered much higher performance without being attached to furniture or being tied to one brand of equipment. Some of these systems had speakers with removable covers, exposing the woofer and tweeter. Production of these systems continued throughout the 1980s and well into the 1990s, until smaller, table-top or countertop units (such as the Bose Wave System) began dominating.

A console television is a television set housed into a cabinet in the same manner as a stereo console.  Production of console televisions lasted much longer than stereo consoles, with units manufactured throughout the 1980s and into the 1990s before being replaced by flat-screen televisions.

Home entertainment centers
Home entertainment centers may be attached to high-fidelity stereo or quadraphonic speakers. By the 2000s, the best sound systems were designed for home theater and movie sound. It typically includes more than just the left and right stereo channels. Television and VHS typically encodes extra channels onto the two main channels, while digital modes encode this information into the digital DVD source data, with center, two rear, and a subwoofer speakers. The difficulty is usually in wiring and placing the  rear speakers and the necessity of buying a receiver that can decode the sound. As the size of video monitors has increased, rather than having a 20-inch TV surrounded by massive stereo equipment, it is common to have a very large flat or projection screen with a small and integrated DVD player / receiver and satellite or digital cable receiver underneath, with small remote speakers and a moderate sized subwoofer.

The audio and video components have special connectors which are often hooked to a dedicated box. The items are then plugged into an electrical outlet strip, which should have a surge protector. Each component typically has its own remote control, though expensive universal remote controls are available that can learn or are programmed with most common equipment.

The term "home entertainment center" may also refer to the complete package – the electronic components and the unit in which they are housed. The unit is often either an armoire or a self-contained unit (usually of wood and glass); they often contain dedicated areas (either drawers or other spaces) for storage of records, videotapes, CDs and/or DVDs.

In many homes, an entertainment center is often placed in the living room, family room, recreation room, or bedroom.  Perhaps the first example of a built-in entertainment center was created by Frank Lloyd Wright at his 1917 Hollyhock House in Los Angeles, California. Custom cabinetry and speakers may be built into or added to an existing house at some expense over free-standing furniture, and video and / or audio signals wired or wirelessly sent to other rooms in the home by dedicated cables, or over a local area network.

The term "home entertainment center" was widely used in the 1980s. It is being replaced by home theater system for large rooms. While high fidelity previously required large turntables, tape decks and speakers, the changing technology of music formats have made small bookshelf systems, Bose desktop radios and iPod based speaker systems which can also produce music of high quality and serve as music entertainment systems by making large component systems again a niche high-end market.

See also
 Home cinema
 Music centre
 Wall unit
 Radiogram

Cabinets (furniture)
Consumer electronics
Furniture